Lady Robinhood is a 1925 American silent drama film directed by Ralph Ince, starring Evelyn Brent, and featuring Boris Karloff.

Plot
As described in a film magazine reviews, in one of the provinces of Spain, cut off by impassable roads, is a people who are ruled by a tyrannical governor and his friend, Cabraza. The ward of the governor, Senorita Catalina, is sympathetic with the peasants and convict labor and, by impersonating a "Lady  Robinhood," seeks to gain for them relief. An American, Hugh Winthrop, enters the province and is captured by La Ortiga (the feminine of Robinhood). He escapes and returns to the palace of the governor where he notices the similarity of the Senorita Catalina to La Ortiga. Confronted, she breaks into tears. Each confesses their love for the other. Raimundo sees the love scene and warns the troops that La Ortiga is in the palace. A raid follows. La Ortiga, Hugh, and Marie are captured. La Ortiga escapes to the hills where she calls her people together and a raid is made upon the palace in time to prevent the death of Hugh and Marie. The governor is seized.

Cast

Preservation
With no prints of Lady Robinhood in any film archives, it is a lost film, but a trailer for the film survives in the collection of the Library of Congress.

See also
 Boris Karloff filmography

References

External links

1925 films
1925 drama films
Silent American drama films
American silent feature films
American black-and-white films
Films directed by Ralph Ince
Film Booking Offices of America films
Lost American films
1925 lost films
Lost drama films
1920s American films